Jenni is the tenth major label studio album by Regional Mexican singer Jenni Rivera, released on September 9, 2008, by Universal Music Latin Entertainment. The album features the hit banda song "Chuper Amigos" and the hit single "Culpable o Inocente".

Jenni reached number one on the Billboard Top Latin Albums Chart in the United States. It reached number 27 on the Top 100 chart in Mexico. It was nominated for Popular Album of the Year at the 2009 Premios Oye!, whereas "Culpable o Inocente" was nominated for Record of the Year. Jenni won Top Latin Album of the Year at the 2009 Billboard Latin Music Awards. It achieved Platinum status in Mexico.

Critical reception

Billboards writer Ayala Ben-Yehud gave the album a positive review, writing "Banda diva Jenni Rivera has trademarked a swingy, midtempo groove on her brass-heavy tunes and a cackling bluntness that other regional Mexican singers of her generation don't even approach." Allmusic gave the album 3.5 out of 5 on Jenni, calling it "her best work in the past decade".

Chart performance
In its first week of release, the album entered on the Billboard 200 albums chart at number thirty-one in the United States and number one on the U.S. Top Latin Albums. It moved 16,000 copies in its first week at retail, giving Rivera her first Top Latin Album number one album and best sales week ever.

Track listing

Chart performance

Sales and certifications

See also
List of number-one Billboard Top Latin Albums of 2008

References

External links 
 Official Page
 Jenni at Amazon

2008 albums
Capitol Records albums
Jenni Rivera albums